Mihail Vântu (1873, Hagi-Abdul - 28 December 1943, Ploieşti) was a politician and journalist from Romania. He served as member of the Parliament of Romania and worked for Cuvânt moldovenesc.

Biography
Mihail Vântu was born in 1873 in Hagi-Abdul and studied in Reni and Bairamcea (near Cetatea Albă). Then became a teacher in Ciocîlteni, Orhei. He advocated the use of the Romanian language in schools. As a member of the Cadet Movement, Mihail Vântu participated at the meetings in Kiev and St Petersburg. In 1906, in the context of the revolution, he was a founder of Basarabia, a newspaper closed by the Russian authorities in 1907. In 1917-1918, he worked for Cuvânt moldovenesc, the newspaper of the National Moldavian Party.

Mihail Vântu served as senator in the Parliament of Romania. After the political career, he graduated from the University of Bucharest and became an engineer in Ploieşti, where became the director-general of the «Societatea petroliera "Orion"».

References

External links
 Basarabia – Personalitati: Mihail Vantu 
  Leonid Cemortan, "Drama intelectualilor basarabeni de stînga", in Revista Sud-Est, Nr. 3/2003. 
 Alte aniversãri 2003 
 Evidenţa informatizată a vieţii literare româneşti

1873 births
1943 deaths
Eastern Orthodox Christians from Romania
People from Cahul District
Romanian journalists
Romanian writers
Romanian engineers
Members of the Senate of Romania
University of Bucharest alumni